Ayamonte Club de Fútbol is a Spanish football team based in Ayamonte, Huelva, in the autonomous community of Andalusia. Founded in 1930 it plays in Tercera División – Group 10, holding home matches at Estadio Ciudad de Ayamonte, with a 5,000-seat capacity.

Season to season

33 seasons in Tercera División

Former players
 Camilo Nvo

External links
Official website 
Futbolme team profile 

Football clubs in Andalusia
Association football clubs established in 1930
1930 establishments in Spain